Luckson Ndaga Mwanjale (born 3 January 1950) is a Tanzanian CCM politician and Member of Parliament for Mbeya Rural constituency since 2009.

References

1950 births
Living people
Chama Cha Mapinduzi MPs
Tanzanian MPs 2005–2010
Tanzanian MPs 2010–2015
Tanzanian schoolteachers